Chris Haggard (born 28 April 1971) is a former professional tennis player from South Africa.

After finishing runner-up in the NAIA national men's tennis championship singles draw in 1991 while playing for Auburn University-Montgomery, Haggard turned pro in 1993. He won six ATP Tour doubles titles and finished runner-up a further 12 times. He reached his career-high doubles ranking of world No. 19 in September 2003.

Haggard played Team Tennis for the Delaware Smash until January 2009.

ATP Tour career finals

Doubles (6 titles, 12 runner-ups)

External links
 
 
 

1971 births
Living people
Sportspeople from Pretoria
Auburn University at Montgomery alumni
South African expatriates in the United States
South African male tennis players
South African people of British descent
White South African people
20th-century South African people